Eucosmophora sideroxylonella is a moth of the family Gracillariidae. It is known from Cuba and Florida.

The length of the forewings is 3.4 mm for males and 3.8 mm for females.

The larvae feed on Lyonia fruticosa, Dipholis salicifolia, Manilkara jaimiqui, Sideroxylon foetidissimum, Sideroxylon celastrinum and Sideroxylon pallidum. They mine the leaves of their host plant. The mine is found on the upperside of young leaves, drawing the leaf longitudinally into a roll or fold, which covers up the mine out of sight.

References

Acrocercopinae
Moths described in 1900
Moths of North America
Moths of Cuba